Andrea Beleska (born 3 January 1994 in Kicevo) is a Macedonian handballer who plays for Yenimahalle Belediyesi SK and the Macedonian national team.

In 2014, she was voted best women's Macedonian handball player by MakRakomet.
HCM Metalurg, CUP WINNERS' CUP 2015-16, 17 goals
Macedonian national team Euro WOMEN Qualification 2016

References

1994 births
Living people
Macedonian female handball players
Expatriate handball players 
Macedonian expatriate sportspeople in Romania
People from Kičevo
Yenimahalle Bld. SK (women's handball) players